Siegburg (i.e. fort on the Sieg river; Ripuarian: Sieburch) is a city in the district of Rhein-Sieg-Kreis in North Rhine-Westphalia, Germany. It is located on the banks of the rivers Sieg and Agger, 10 kilometres from the former seat of West German government Bonn and 26 kilometres from Cologne.  The population of the city was 39,192 in the 2013 census.

Geography
Siegburg is located approximately 8 kilometres east of the river Rhine, at the confluence where the Agger joins the Sieg, in the southeast corner of the Cologne Lowland. Neighbouring towns include Troisdorf, Lohmar, Sankt Augustin and Hennef. The nearby cities of Cologne and Bonn are easily accessible through good transport links. The highest point of the urban area is 220m above sea level (NHN) in the Braschoß area and the lowest point is just under 54m above sea level at the mouth of the Agger.

History

Archbishop-Elector Anno II of Cologne founded a Benedictine monastery in 1064, known as Michaelsberg Abbey, on top of the hill also called the Michaelsberg. A settlement that arose from that was first mentioned as a city in 1182. Siegburg reached the height of its prosperity in the 15th and 16th century. It is famous for its pottery, especially for the Siegburg pitchers (Siegburger Krüge).

Siegburg has been the county seat of the Rhein-Sieg-Kreis since 1816.

Siegburg's synagogue was destroyed on Kristallnacht, signaling the demise of its Jewish community.

Politics

Municipal elections are held every five years, in which the mayor and city council of Siegburg, as well as the district administrator and district council of the Rhein-Sieg-Kreis are chosen. The last election took place on 13 September 2020.

City council

The city council of Siegburg consists of 50 councillors, half of which are chosen directly in 25 constituencies. The remaining 25 seats are distributed via party lists, resulting in a proportional representation.

On 30 October 2020 the Social Democrats, Greens, and Liberals agreed to form a coalition government.

Mayor
The mayor of Siegburg is Stefan Rosemann, who was elected with 57.54% of the vote. He stated that he would withdraw from party politics and completely focus on the mayoral office. He was sworn into office on 5 November 2020.

Transport
Siegburg/Bonn station is a railway station on the Cologne-Frankfurt high-speed railway and the Sieg Railway. The name of the station derives from it having been rebuilt for the high-speed line in order to serve Bonn. It is connected to Bonn by the Siegburg line of the Bonn Stadtbahn every 10 or 15 minutes. The station is located in the network area of the Verkehrsverbund Rhein-Sieg (Rhine-Sieg Transport Association, VRS) public transit authority.

Twin towns – sister cities

Siegburg is twinned with:
 Bolesławiec, Poland
 Guarda, Portugal
 Nogent-sur-Marne, France
 Orestiada, Greece
 Selçuk, Turkey

Notable people 
 Engelbert Humperdinck (1854–1921), composer
 Adelheid Wette, author, composer and librettist
 Joseph Hermann Mohr (1834–1892), priest, hymn writer and hymnologist
 Liselotte Hammes (born 1933), operatic soprano and academic voice teacher
 Wolfgang Overath (born 1943), footballer
 Anja-Nina Bahrmann (born 1980), soprano
 Catharina Felser (born 1982), racing driver

References

External links

 (in German)

Rhein-Sieg-Kreis
Districts of the Rhine Province
Holocaust locations in Germany